Mount Holmboe is a mountain,  high, standing  north of Mount Liavaag and  northwest of Mount Weems near the extreme north end of the Sentinel Range in the Ellsworth Mountains of Antarctica. It was discovered by Lincoln Ellsworth on his trans-Antarctic flight of November 23, 1935, and was named by the Advisory Committee on Antarctic Names for Dr. Jørgen Holmboe, a meteorologist on Ellsworth's Antarctic expedition of 1933–34.

See also
 Mountains in Antarctica

References

Ellsworth Mountains
Mountains of Ellsworth Land